Ulex argenteus is a species of gorse native to southern Portugal (Algarve and Alentejo) in the Iberian Peninsula.

Description 
Ulex argenteus is a low-growing shrub with an open branching structure. Branches, stems, and spines are densely covered in short erect hairs, which give the species a silvery colour. Spines are thin and straight or sometimes slightly arched. The calyx is typically 7.5 to 8.5 mm long.

Taxonomy and systematics 
Ulex argenteus is a diploid species. The diploid Ulex canescens, and the polyploid Ulex erinaceus  and Ulex subsericeus  have been included in Ulex argenteus in  the past, as subspecies or synonyms. However, phylogenetic evidence suggests they are not closely related to U. argenteus.

Distribution and habitat 
The species is distributed in southern Portugal, growing in both metamorphic and calcareous hills.

Conservation 
The species has a narrow distribution range but remains common in suitable habitat. As a result, it has been assessed as Least Concern.

References

argenteus
Flora of Portugal
Endemic flora of the Iberian Peninsula
Plants described in 1852